The following are the national records in athletics in Argentina maintained by its national athletics federation: Argentine Athletics Confederation (CADA).

Outdoor

Key to tables:

+ = en route to a longer distance

h = hand timing

A = affected by altitude

X = unratified due to doping violation

# = not ratified by federation

OT = oversized track (> 200m in circumference)

Men

Women

Mixed

Indoor

Men

Women

Notes

References
General
Argentine Athletics Record Page 2 February 2020 updated
Specific

External links
CADA web site

Argentine
Records
Athletics
Athletics